Jazz is an album by saxophonist John Handy III featuring tracks recorded in 1962 and originally released on the Roulette label.

Reception

AllMusic awarded the album 3 stars and its review by Scott Yanow states, "Handy's appealing and already distinctive alto sound, combined with an exploratory style, resulted in this music having plenty of surprising moments".

Track listing
All compositions by John Handy III except as indicated
 "From Bird" - 5:50
 "Blues for M.F." - 7:27
 "East of the Sun (and West of the Moon)" (Brooks Bowman) - 7:54
 "No Smiles Please" - 6:52
 "Strugglin'" - 6:23
 "Afternoon Outing" - 6:46

Personnel 
John Handy III - alto saxophone
Walter Bishop, Jr. - piano
Julian Euell - bass
Edgar Bateman - drums

References 

1962 albums
John Handy albums
Albums produced by Teddy Reig
Roulette Records albums